Choniates may refer to:

Niketas Choniates (c. 1155 – 1215 or 1216), Byzantine chronicler
Michael Choniates (c. 1140 – 1220), Byzantine writer and ecclesiastic